Aleksey Yufkin (born January 11, 1986) is a Russian weightlifter.

External links
the-sports.org
iwf.net

1986 births
Living people
World Weightlifting Championships medalists
Russian male weightlifters
European Weightlifting Championships medalists
20th-century Russian people
21st-century Russian people